Surrey-Fleetwood is a provincial electoral district in British Columbia, Canada, established by the Electoral Districts Act, 2008. It was first contested in the 2009 election. Surrey-Fleetwood is an amalgamation of most of Surrey-Tynehead along with portions of Surrey-Green Timbers, Surrey-Newton and Surrey-Cloverdale.

Member of Legislative Assembly 
On account of the realignment of electoral boundaries, most incumbents did not represent the entirety of their listed district during the preceding legislative term. Dave Hayer, British Columbia Liberal Party (BC Liberals) was initially elected during the 2001 election and 2005 election to the Surrey-Tynehead riding. Jagrup Brar of the New Democrats was elected in the 2009 election in this newly re-districted riding. Brar lost the seat to Peter Fassbender of the BC Liberals in the 2013 election, but won it back in the 2017 election.

MLAs
This riding has elected the following Members of Legislative Assembly:

Election results

|-
 
|NDP
|Jagrup Brar
|align="right"|8,852
|align="right"|49.29%
|align="right"|n/a
|align="right"|$81,623

|}

References

British Columbia provincial electoral districts
Politics of Surrey, British Columbia
Provincial electoral districts in Greater Vancouver and the Fraser Valley